Bullcamp is a rural locality in the South Burnett Region, Queensland, Australia.

Geography
Brisbane Gully (also known as Linedale Branch) is a watercourse.

Fairbrothers Lagoon is a waterhole

History 

References 

South Burnett Region
Localities in Queensland